Barbital (or barbitone), marketed under the brand names Veronal for the pure acid and Medinal for the sodium salt, was the first commercially available barbiturate. It was used as a sleeping aid (hypnotic) from 1903 until the mid-1950s. The chemical names for barbital are diethylmalonyl urea or diethylbarbituric acid; hence, the sodium salt (known as medinal, a genericised trademark in the United Kingdom) is known also as sodium diethylbarbiturate.

Synthesis 
Barbital, then called "Veronal", was first synthesized in 1902 by German chemists Emil Fischer and Joseph von Mering,  who published their discovery in 1903. Barbital was prepared by condensing diethylmalonic ester with urea in the presence of sodium ethoxide, or by adding at least two molar equivalents of ethyl iodide to the silver salt of malonylurea (barbituric acid) or possibly to a basic solution of the acid. The result was an odorless, slightly bitter, white crystalline powder.

Its introduction followed the investigations of Fischer and von Mering on the pharmacological properties of certain open and closed acylureas (then called ureides). Led by the impression that hypnotic action appears to be largely dependent on the presence of ethyl groups, they prepared diethylacetyl urea, diethylmalonyl urea (i.e., Barbital itself), and dipropylmalonyl urea. All three were found to be hypnotics: the first was about equal in power to the already-known sulphonal (now sulfonmethane), whilst the third was four times as powerful, but its use was attended by prolonged after-effects. Veronal was found to be midway.

Barbital can also be synthesized in a condensation reaction from urea and diethyl-2,2-diethylmalonate, a diethyl malonate derivative:

Marketing

Barbital was marketed in 1904 by the Bayer company as “Veronal”. A soluble salt of barbital was marketed by the Schering company as “Medinal.” It was dispensed for “insomnia induced by nervous excitability”. It was provided in either crystal form or in cachets (capsules). The therapeutic dose was ten to fifteen grains (0.6-1 grams). 3.5 to 4.4 grams (55 to 68 grains) is the deadly dose but sleep has also been prolonged up to ten days with recovery.

Pharmacology 
Barbital was considered to be a great improvement over the existing hypnotics. Its taste was slightly bitter, but better than the strong, unpleasant taste of the commonly used bromides.  It had few side effects, and its therapeutic dose was far below the toxic dose. However, prolonged usage resulted in tolerance to the drug, requiring higher doses to reach the desired effect. "I'm literally saturated with it," the Russian tsarina Alexandra Feodorovna confessed to a friend. Fatal overdoses of this slow-acting hypnotic were not uncommon. Pioneering aviator Arthur Whitten Brown (of "Transatlantic flight of Alcock and Brown" fame) died of an accidental overdose.

A photoswitchable derivative of barbital based on a donor-acceptor Stenhouse adduct (DASA) has been developed for research purposes (photopharmacology). DASA-barbital shows neuronal activity via GABAA receptors and reversible photoisomerization in water using cyclodextrin.

pH buffer 
Solutions of sodium barbital have also been used as pH buffers for biological research, e.g., in immunoelectrophoresis or in fixative solutions. As barbital is a controlled substance, barbital-based buffers have largely been replaced by other substances.

Suicide 
Japanese writer Ryūnosuke Akutagawa deliberately overdosed on the drug in 1927, as did Un Chien Andalou actor Pierre Batcheff in 1932, Austrian writer Stefan Zweig in 1942, French Anarchist Germaine Berton in 1942, and Greek musician Attik in 1944. During The Holocaust, many Jewish residents of Berlin, Dresden, Wiesbaden and other German cities used Veronal to commit suicide to avoid deportation to concentration camps by the Nazi Regime. Alfred Kerr, a German theatre critic and essayist, suffered a stroke on a trip to Germany after WWII and decided to end his own life via an overdose of Veronal, which was procured for him by his wife

In the D. H. Lawrence story, The Lovely Lady, the titular character dies from a self-administered overdose.

Barbital, under the name of "Veronal", has been used as a plot device in the author Agatha Christie's murder mysteries.

In Stephen King's novel The Stand, some characters used Veronal in small doses as a way to suppress the ever-intensifying nightmares involving the "dark man" they communally experienced.

The main character in Dorothy Parker's short story Big Blonde, Hazel Morse, buys 2 bottles of Veronal tablets over the counter with the intention of committing suicide.

In Miroslav Krleža's drama "Messrs. Glembay", Irena Danielli-Basilides overdosed on Veronal as her third and fatal suicide attempt.

References

Further reading 

 

 Norena Shopland T he Veronal Mystery (Wordcatcher Publishing) 2020 

Barbiturates
GABAA receptor positive allosteric modulators